Thomas Galimberti (born 12 November 2003) is an Italian ice hockey player for Lahti Pelicans and the Italian national team.

He represented Italy at the 2021 IIHF World Championship.

References

External links
 

2003 births
Living people
Italian ice hockey forwards
Ice hockey people from Bolzano
Peliitat Heinola players